Aurélien Recoing (born 5 May 1958) is a French actor and stage director.

Personal life

Born in Paris on May 5, 1958, Aurélien Recoing began training to be an actor in 1974 at Cours Florent, and studied at Quartier d'Ivry. In 1977, the actor-in-training, who spoke fluent English and a little Russian, joined the Conservatoire national supérieur d'art dramatique in Paris, where he studied under Jean-Pierre Miquel and Antoine Vitez. He has appeared in more than 30 plays and has directed stage performances of works by Thomas Bernhard, Fernando Pessoa and Paul Claudel.

In 1980, Aurélien Recoing took his first steps into the world of cinema, in Exploits of a Young Don Juan. Finding art-house cinema appealing to him, he worked with Philippe Garrel on Emergency Kisses (Les baisers de secours), and with Laurence Ferreira Barbosa on Modern Life. The actor rose to fame in 2001 thanks to Laurent Cantet's Time Out (L'Emploi du Temps), in which he plays a man who invents a false life to avoid having to tell his friends and family that he has been fired from his job. As he became more and more in demand, he alternated between blockbusters such as Ruby & Quentin and That Woman and art-house films like L'Ennemi naturel and Orlando Vargas. Lending his talents to a number of unusual projects, in 2006 he portrayed a gamblers in 13 Tzameti, Géla Babluani's black-and-white thriller, and also appeared in Forgive Me (Pardonnez-moi), Maïwenn's home-movie style drama. In the same year, the physically imposing actor found himself transported back to 1914 France in Fragments of Antonin, and then to 1959 Kabylia in Florent Emilio Siri's Intimate Enemies. In 2008, he starred in ' Paris Nord-Sud and in La Saison des Orphelins. The following year, he was cast in Gilles Béhat's crime thriller Diamant 13 with Gérard Depardieu, and in Denis Dercourt's Tomorrow at Dawn (Demain dès l'aube).

He appeared in Frédéric Schoendoerffer's Switch, as well as in 's Kill Me Please, which won the Marc'Aurelio d'Oro for best film at Rome Film Festival in 2010. He also appeared in Abdellatif Kechiche's Blue is the Warmest Colour, which took the Palme d'Or at Cannes. In 2020 he appeared in Adults in the room. An upcoming appearance is in Grand Ciel an Arte Film.

He made his first short film as a director The Rifleman (Un Bon Tireur) which won an Award Winner for Best Drama in 2021. He is developing his first feature film Naked Hands (À Mains Nues) with Sensito Films Productions.

Theatre

Filmography

External links 
 

French male film actors
1958 births
Living people
French male television actors
French National Academy of Dramatic Arts alumni
Cours Florent alumni
20th-century French male actors
21st-century French male actors
French male stage actors
French theatre directors
Male actors from Paris